Arabinosyl nucleosides are derivatives of the nucleosides. They contain – in contrast to most nucleosides – instead of the β-D-Ribofuranose the β-D-Arabinofuranose. They are mostly used as cytostatics or virostatics.

Examples

Literature 
 W. E. Müller: "Rational design of arabinosyl nucleosides as antitumor and antiviral agents", Jpn J Antibiot. 1977 Dec;30 Suppl:104–120; .